Klädd för att gå is a 1996 studio album by CajsaStina Åkerström.

Track listing
Kom — 5:02
Om bara för en dag — 4:20
Socker, knäckebröd & choklad — 4:06
Långt härifrån — 3:48
Klädd för att gå — 3:47
Kanske en ängel — 3:47
Tänk om — 5:09
Tid för att tänka — 3:52
Lyckan kommer och lyckan går — 3:38
Mitt hjärtas begär — 5:31

Contributors
Magnus Frykberg - drums
Sven Lindvall - bass guitar
Kristoffer Wallman - keyboard
Lasse Halapi - guitar

Chart positions

References

1996 albums
CajsaStina Åkerström albums